Güllük is a town in Muğla Province, Turkey.

Güllük may also refer to:

Güllük, Azerbaijan, a village in Qakh Rayon
Güllük Gulf, an Aegean gulf of Turkey
Güllük, Kulp
Güllük Dağı (Mount Güllük), a mountain in Turkey in the Mount Güllük-Termessos National Park

See also
Güllük Port